KRKE (1100 kHz) is an AM radio station licensed to Peralta, New Mexico, serving the Albuquerque radio market. The station also feeds FM translator K229CL on 93.7 FM. The station is airing a 1980s hits format. The new format launched at noon on Friday October 14, 2022.

History
The earliest record for an original construction permit was filed on February 2, 2004, by Bret D. Huggins to broadcast a 50kW daytime signal on 1120 KHz. However, it would not be granted until November 30, 2018. Huggins would then sell the permit to Vanguard Media owner Don Davis for $25,000 in June 2020. On March 15, 2021, it was assigned call letters KVVD. In September 2021 a modification was filed to move the broadcast to 1100 KHz at 1000 watts daytime only. It was licensed on February 28, 2022.

K229CL 93.7
An original construction permit was granted on October 23, 2013. It was licensed to Telebeeper of New Mexico and would sign on at 40 watts in summer 2014 with the license granted on August 8. On March 30, 2015, it was licensed to broadcast at the full 250 watts. KDSK would be the primary station until the owners KD Radio would move their FM translator out of Grants, New Mexico to Albuquerque at 92.9 K225CH in the Fall of 2016. In Spring 2017 KIVA 1600 would begin a rebroadcast on the translator until the end of 2020. K229CL would be silent for nearly all of 2021 until returning in late December simulcasting the Regional Mexican programming from KDLW (now KXOT) 106.3. On September 29, 2022, the primary station was changed to KRKE 1100 AM. On October 10, 2022, both stations began stunting with a 10 minute loop of remixed clips of 80s hits. On October 14, 2022, at noon, KRKE/K229CL launched an all-80's hits format as "The Eighties Channel", which was previously heard on the former KRKE (now KQNM) on 1550 AM from 2014 to 2015.

References

External links

RKE (AM)
Radio stations established in 2022
2022 establishments in the United States